"Summer Rain" is a song written by James Hendricks and performed by Johnny Rivers on his 1968 LP Realization.  Of his several dozen releases, it is considered his sixth greatest hit internationally.

It reached No. 14 on the U.S. Billboard Hot 100, No. 6 on the U.S. Cash Box Top 100, and No. 10 in Canada in early January, 1968.

"Summer Rain" is about lifelong love during "the summer of love" of 1967. It was released in the late fall, as a reminiscence of the previous summer.  The song references Sgt. Pepper's Lonely Hearts Club Band, the Beatles album which was released during the middle of that year.

Chart performance

Weekly charts

Year-end charts

Personnel
 Lead vocals by Johnny Rivers
 Strings and horns by Marty Paich
 Drums by Hal Blaine
 Bass by Joe Osborn

References

External links
 

1967 singles
Johnny Rivers songs
1967 songs
Imperial Records singles